Synodontis batensoda, the upside-down catfish, is a species of mochokid upside-down catfish.  It is unevenly distributed in inland waters across Africa from Senegal to Ethiopia, and is also known as a squeaker or giant upside-down catfish.  It was originally described by Eduard Rüppell in 1832 in the paper "Continuation of the description and figure of several new fish, in the Nile. p1-14".

The species is now regionally extinct in Northern Africa, but used to be found in Cairo during floods. It can be found in portions of the White Nile, Blue Nile, and the Baro Rivers in northeast Africa, and the Chad, Niger, Senegal, and Gambia river basins in western Africa. It occurs in slow-moving waters and marshes bordering large rivers.

Synodontis batensoda is silver-green to blue-grey with black barbels and a blackish underside (thus its specific name, from Arabic 
بطن السوداء bațn sawdā' = "black belly").  Occasionally, individuals can be reddish brown.  Juveniles display large dark-colored blotches on the sides separated by pale patches.

It has 39–42 gill rakers rather than 7–33 as in other Synodontis species, and its dorsal fin and adipose fin are contiguous. The body is short and deep, the eyes are large, and its colouration is grey-black tinged with brown, with a faint network of dark black spots. There is a comb of small spines near the point of the operculum. The maxillary barbels have membranes, though these are not as wide as in Hemisynodontis. The caudal fin is forked, with each lobe ending in a point. Like other Synodontis species, this fish almost always swims upside down.

This omnivorous fish feeds on plankton, algae, detritus, surface insects, chironomid larvae, benthic crustaceans, and molluscs. It is oviparous and venomous.

In the aquarium hobby, it is peaceful and hardy fish that is compatible with even small fish, but may be bullied by more aggressive Synodontis species.

References

External links

Synodontis
Venomous fish
Fish of Cameroon
Fish of Chad
Fish of Egypt
Fish of Ethiopia
Freshwater fish of West Africa
Fish of Sudan
Fish described in 1832